Pronophila is a genus of butterflies from the subfamily Satyrinae in the family Nymphalidae. The species in the genus Pronophila occur in South America, including Peru, Venezuela, and Ecuador.

Species
Listed alphabetically:
Pronophila attali
Pronophila bernardi
Pronophila cordillera
Pronophila colocasia
Pronophila cuchillaensis
Pronophila epidipnis
Pronophila intercidona
Pronophila isobelae – Isobel's butterfly, originally Pronophila benevola
Pronophila juliani
Pronophila margarita
Pronophila obscura
Pronophila orcus
Pronophila rosenbergi
Pronophila thelebe
Pronophila timanthes
Pronophila tremocrata
Pronophila unifasciata

References 

 
Satyrini
Nymphalidae of South America
Nymphalidae genera
Taxa named by Edward Doubleday